Nuriddinjon Ismailov is a politician from Uzbekistan who is serving as Speaker of the Legislative Chamber of Uzbekistan.

References 

Uzbekistani political people